Hannah Reyes Morales is a Filipina photojournalist from Manila, Philippines. 

The focus of Morales’ work surrounds resiliency and the bonds between individuals. Interested in how individuals face hardship, often her photographs will document the impoverished and observe the dignity of the poor despite the systemic inequality and injustice that is experienced.

Early life 
Morales was raised in Manila, Philippines with her mother and 12 relatives. In high school, Morales tutored children in poor communities and gained valuable experience during that time. Enrollment in a photography class while attending the University of the Philippines led to an internship at the European Pressphoto Agency and further exploration in photography. It was at the University where Morales was introduced to photojournalism through one of her professors.

Career 
Over her career, she has traveled through Asia to document the daily lives of individuals and families within struggling communities. Between 2013 - 2016, she lived in Cambodia where her work included documentation of Cambodian bride trades and forced marriages. Thus far in her career, she has documented significant events including the anti-drug wars in the Philippines. When she first began photographing the effects, she documented the deaths that were occurring regularly. 

Her focus quickly shifted to the stories of the individuals and families in the neighborhoods where the deaths took place. Her themes of resilience within community can also be seen in a variety of projects such as Shelter from the Storm, about women forced into the sex trade industry due to displacement by natural disasters. Additional projects include Roots from Ashes, Eagle Hunters, and Seasons of Darkness.

Awards and recognitions 
Morales is the recipient of numerous awards. In 2020, she was awarded the Infinity Award for Documentary Practice and Visual Journalism by the International Center of Photography.  She has also received the 2019 Tim Hetherington Visionary Award, The Royal Photographic Society Margaret Harker media for 100 Photographic Heroines, and the 2016 SOPA Award for Excellence in Digital Reporting. In addition, she was previously awarded a grant from the National Geographic Society.

Works 
Morales has worked with numerous newspapers, magazines, and projects. Her work has been shown in The New York Times, The Washington Post, CNN Philippines, and the Atlantic. Additionally, she since working as a National Geographic Explorer since 2017. In 2020, she was named a cultural leader by the World Economic Forum.

References 

Year of birth missing (living people)
Living people
Writers from Manila
Filipino women journalists
University of the Philippines alumni
Photojournalists

External links 
 Hannah Reyes Morales - official website/portfolio
 Hannah Reyes Morales: Using photography to inspire empathy (profile at the National Geographic website)